Stealth Mission is a 1988 video game published by Sublogic for the Commodore 64.

Gameplay
Stealth Mission is a game in which the player can pilot one of three different aircraft: the F-19 Stealth Fighter, the X-29 Swept Wing, and the F-14 Tomcat.

Reception
Brad Bombardiere reviewed the game for Computer Gaming World, and stated that "even though this game doesn't really offer the intensity that one could expect from other recent flight simulations, the potential buyer must weigh the abstract nature of the scenarios and somewhat slower pace against the graphic excellence and technical quality of the Sublogic line."

Reviews
Zzap! - May, 1988
Commodore Format - Jul, 1991
The Games Machine - Jun, 1988
Computer Gaming World - Jun, 1992

References

External links
Review in Compute!
Review in Info
Review in Power Play (German)
Review in Ahoy!
Review in Commodore Computing International
Review in Commodore Magazine
Review in Commodore Computer Club
Review in Arcades (French)

1988 video games
Combat flight simulators
Commodore 64 games
Commodore 64-only games
Video games developed in the United States